Vertidue was an Anglo-French phrase, used during World War I, originally defined as ‘a vile mix of wet feces and soil.’ It became a regular expression amongst those bunker sharing British and French troops.

References

Military slang and jargon
1910s neologisms
Cultural history of World War I